The Serra Hills are a mountain range in Sandaun Province, Papua New Guinea.

The Serra Hills languages are spoken in the mountain range.

See also
Serra Hills languages

References

Mountain ranges of Papua New Guinea